Musau is a municipality in the district of Reutte in the Austrian state of Tyrol.

Geography
Musau lies north of Reutte in a basin where the Lech widens to form a small lake.

References

Cities and towns in Reutte District